Višnjevac may refer to:

 Višnjevac, Osijek-Baranja County, a village near Osijek, Croatia
 Višnjevac, Bjelovar-Bilogora County, a village near Veliko Trojstvo, Croatia
 Višnjevac, Serbia, a village near Subotica, Serbia